The Desert Ridge master-planned community comprises  and is situated in the Northeast Valley of Phoenix, Arizona.  As one of Arizona’s largest master-planned communities, Desert Ridge could contain more than 50,000 residents.  The community includes CityNorth, Toscana of Desert Ridge, Desert Ridge Marketplace, JW Marriott Desert Ridge Resort & Spa, Mayo Clinic Hospital and American Express regional campus.

Timeline 

 1991 – Specific Plan adopted
 1993 – First  purchased/leased
 1993 – Master Developer assigned
 1996 – First homes sold
 1997 – SUMCO (Sumitomo Metal Industries) opens
 1998 – Mayo Clinic Hospital opens
 2001 – Desert Ridge Marketplace opens
 2002 – American Express regional campus opens
 2002 – Loop 101 opens to the east
 2002 – JW Marriott Desert Ridge Resort & Spa opens
 2002 – Wildfire Golf Club opens
 2006 – Desert Ridge Medical Campus opens
 2008 – CityCenter of CityNorth, Phase I – Opened November 2008
 2008 – Residence Inn by Marriott, part of Mayo Clinic – Opened fall 2008
 2010 – Musical Instrument Museum – Opened early 2010
 2010 – Sagewood – Opened early 2010
 2010 – CityCenter of CityNorth, Phase II – Opened fall 2010
 2010 - CityNorth Developer sued Gray development. Gray awarded 110 million.

History of Desert Ridge 

Created through a public-private partnership between the State of Arizona, City of Phoenix and the Master Developer, the Desert Ridge master plan, adopted by the City of Phoenix as the Desert Ridge Specific Plan, has guided development in the community since 1991.  

Already in place, in addition to several residential neighborhoods with nearly 4,000 homes, are Mayo Clinic’s  Phoenix campus that includes Mayo Clinic Hospital and Mayo Clinic Specialty Building; Desert Ridge Marketplace, a  retail, dining and entertainment center; Toscana of Desert Ridge Condo community, and JW Marriott Desert Ridge Resort & Spa, which includes Wildfire Golf Club with 36 holes of championship golf, a day spa, restaurants and bars, expansive pool grounds, a conference center, 252 time-share units, and a 950-room hotel – the largest in the state of Arizona.

Schools 
Desert Ridge is part of the Paradise Valley Unified School District.  The community is home to 4 schools ranging from kindergarten to 12th grade, which include Desert Trails Elementary School, Explorer Middle School, Paradise Valley High School and Pinnacle High School.  Pinnacle High School ranked among Newsweek’s top 1300 schools in America during the 2007 school year.

External links 
 http://www.experiencedesertridge.com

References 

Neighborhoods in Phoenix, Arizona